Timothy Alan Dick (born June 13, 1953), known professionally as Tim Allen, is an American actor and comedian. He is known for playing Tim "The Toolman" Taylor on the ABC sitcom Home Improvement (1991–1999) for which he won a Golden Globe Award and Mike Baxter on the ABC/Fox sitcom Last Man Standing (2011–2021). He voices Buzz Lightyear for the Toy Story franchise for which he won an Annie Award and played Scott Calvin and Santa Claus in The Santa Clause franchise (1994–present). Allen's other films include Tropical Snow (1988), Galaxy Quest (1999), Joe Somebody (2001), Zoom (2006), Wild Hogs (2007), The Six Wives of Henry Lefay (2009), Crazy on the Outside (2010), 3 Geezers! (2013), and El Camino Christmas (2017).

Early life 
Allen was born in Denver, Colorado, on June 13, 1953. He is the third oldest of six children of Martha Katherine (née Fox), a community-service worker, and Gerald M. Dick, a real estate agent. Allen has two older brothers, two younger brothers, and a younger sister. His father died in a car accident in November 1964, colliding with a drunk driver when Allen was 11. Two years later, his mother married her high school sweetheart, a business executive, and moved with her six children to Birmingham, Michigan, to be with her new husband and his three children. Allen has said the move meant going from "being in a cool group at one school to being at the bottom [of the social hierarchy at another]."

Allen attended Seaholm High School in Birmingham, where he was in theater and music classes (resulting in his love of classical piano). He then attended Central Michigan University before transferring to Western Michigan University in 1974. At Western Michigan, Allen worked at the student radio station WIDR. In 1976 he received a Bachelor of Science degree in communications, specializing in radio and television production, with a split minor in philosophy and design.

Career 

Allen started his career as a comedian in 1975. On a dare from one of his friends, he participated in a comedy night at Mark Ridley's Comedy Castle in Royal Oak, a suburb of Detroit. While in Detroit he began to get recognition appearing in local television commercials and appearing on cable comedy shows such as Gary Thison's Some Semblance of Sanity. Following his release from prison in 1981, he returned to comedy. He moved to Los Angeles and became a regular performer at The Comedy Store. He began performing stand-up appearances on late-night talk shows and specials on record and film. In 1998, Western Michigan awarded Allen an honorary fine arts degree and the Distinguished Alumni Award.

In a magazine interview, Allen once said, "I can only play a part if I can draw on personal experience, and that well can go dry pretty quickly". Despite his admitted limited acting range, Allen rose to fame in acting with the sitcom Home Improvement (1991–1999) produced for ABC by Wind Dancer Productions, a company he cofounded with producer Carmen Finestra. Allen played the main character Tim "The Tool-Man" Taylor. In November 1994, he simultaneously starred in the highest-grossing film (Walt Disney Pictures's The Santa Clause), topped The New York Times bestseller list with his book Don't Stand Too Close to a Naked Man, and appeared in the top-rated television series (Home Improvement) within one week. Home Improvement ran until 1999, for which he was paid US$1.25 million per episode.

In 1995, Allen provided the voice of Buzz Lightyear in the Disney/Pixar blockbuster Toy Story. In 1997, he starred in the family comedy Jungle 2 Jungle from Disney. The next year he returned to voice Buzz Lightyear in Toy Story 2, which was a financial and critical hit. In 1999, he starred in the sci-fi parody Galaxy Quest alongside Sigourney Weaver, Alan Rickman, and Sam Rockwell.

In 2002, he reprised his role as Scott Calvin in The Santa Clause 2. Two years later, he starred as Luther Krank in Christmas with the Kranks. In 2006, Zoom was released, starring Allen as Jack Shepard. The same year, he also starred in The Shaggy Dog and The Santa Clause 3. The year 2008 marked his first dramatic turn with a supporting role as an aging action film star in David Mamet's Redbelt.

Allen began narrating the "Pure Michigan" television and radio commercials for the "Travel Michigan" agency. These commercials can be seen and heard throughout the Midwest and began airing nationally in 2009.

In December 2009, he started a preview tour of Crazy on the Outside, a film that debuted in January 2010. Allen accompanied the film, helping promote it with a series of stand-up acts beforehand. During the performances, he told audiences he planned a 2010 comedy tour. Allen also directed the film, marking his film directorial debut.

Allen hosted the 8th Annual TV Land Awards on April 25, 2010. That same year, he returned the role of Buzz Lightyear in Toy Story 3 and also became the official voice of the Chevrolet Cruze, narrating commercials for the vehicle, and he became the voice of Campbell Soup Company's "It's Amazing What Soup Can Do" campaign. Allen returned to ABC with the sitcom Last Man Standing (2011–2017). He played the role of Mike Baxter, a conservative father fighting for his manhood in a house filled with women. The character is loosely based on his own life, as a Republican father of three girls. After six seasons, the show was canceled in May 2017. ABC Entertainment Chief Channing Dungey denied claims of political bias against Allen, explaining that the network could not accommodate the program on their schedule. On May 11, 2018, Fox TV's CEOs and chairmen announced that Fox had officially picked up Last Man Standing for a seventh season.

Shortly before the cancellation of Last Man Standing, Allen had been announced as part of the cast of the Netflix original comedy film El Camino Christmas (2017). In 2018, he had a cameo voice role as Buzz Lightyear in Ralph Breaks the Internet. In 2019, he voiced the character in Toy Story 4 and appeared as himself in No Safe Spaces a documentary film. In 2022, it was announced that Allen would reprise the role of Scott Calvin in a Disney+ mini-series, The Santa Clauses, based on The Santa Clause franchise.

On June 30, 2022,  the History Channel series More Power premiered, with co-host Allen reunited with Richard Karn. The show covered the history of tools and included field reports of people who use powerful tools. In February 2023, Allen announced that he would return as the voice of Buzz Lightyear for a fifth installment of the Toy Story franchise.

Personal life 

Allen was raised as an Episcopalian. He married Laura Deibel on April 7, 1984. Their daughter, Katherine, was born in December 1989. He and Deibel legally separated in 1999 and finalized their divorce in 2003. Allen married actress Jane Hajduk on October 7, 2006, in a small private ceremony in Grand Lake, Colorado. They had been dating for five years. Their daughter, Elizabeth, was born in March 2009.

He subsequently pleaded guilty to felony drug trafficking charges and provided the names of other dealers in exchange for a sentence of three to seven years rather than a possible life imprisonment. He was paroled on June 12, 1981, after serving two years and four months in Federal Correctional Institution, Sandstone, in Sandstone, Minnesota.

In 1998, Allen was arrested for driving under the influence in Birmingham, Michigan. At the time, his blood alcohol content was 0.15, nearly double the legal limit in Michigan. He was sentenced to one-year probation and entered a rehabilitation clinic for alcohol abuse as part of his court obligation.

Allen is a supporter of the Republican Party. However, he condemned then-president Trump and those taking part in the 2021 United States Capitol attack, calling the incident "horrible, embarrassing, and shameful" and opining that the rioters must have had inside help. He also said the riot had caused people to be embarrassed to be known as conservative.

Allen is a car enthusiast and competed in endurance racing for Saleen in a co-owned car in the 1990s, including the 24 Hours of Daytona. He also has an impressive car collection, which he houses in a former paint shop in Southern California. As of 2022, the collection includes a 1956 Ford F-100 custom made by McLaren, a 1965 Shelby Cobra, and a 1966 Ferrari 330 GTC, which by itself is estimated to be worth over $3,410,000.

Allen is also involved in philanthropic efforts to help reduce homelessness.

Filmography

Film

Television

Video games

Accolades

Awards and nominations

Other honors 
 1999: Named a Disney Legend for his work on the Toy Story and The Santa Clause franchises
 2004: Received a motion pictures star on the Hollywood Walk of Fame at 6834 Hollywood Boulevard for his contributions to the film industry
 2017: Inducted into the Diecast Hall of Fame

Honorary scholastic degrees

Books 
 Don't Stand Too Close to a Naked Man (1994) – 
 I'm Not Really Here (1996) –

References

External links 

 
 
 
 

1953 births
Living people
20th-century American comedians
20th-century American male actors
21st-century American comedians
21st-century American male actors
Amateur radio people
American drug traffickers
American male comedians
American male film actors
American male television actors
American male video game actors
American male voice actors
American philanthropists
American stand-up comedians
Annie Award winners
Audiobook narrators
Best Musical or Comedy Actor Golden Globe (television) winners
California Republicans
Central Michigan University alumni
Colorado Republicans
Comedians from Colorado
Comedians from Michigan
Disney people
Male actors from Denver
Male actors from Detroit
Michigan Republicans
People from Birmingham, Michigan
People from Grand County, Colorado
People from Royal Oak, Michigan
Western Michigan University alumni